Aristophon (Ancient Greek: Ἀριστοφῶν) was an Athenian comic poet of the Middle Comedy. He was probably victorious at least once at the Lenaia around 350 BCE (IG II2 2325.151).

Surviving titles and fragments
The following eight titles, along with fifteen associated fragments, are all that has survived of Aristophon's work:

 Babias
 Twin Girls, or Pyraunos
 The Physician
 Callonides
 Perithous
 Plato
 The Pythagorean
 Philonides

References
 Rudolf Kassel and Colin Austin, Poetae Comici Graeci, Vol. 4

4th-century BC Athenians
Ancient Greek dramatists and playwrights
Middle Comic poets